= Anna Janssens =

Dutch businessperson

Anna Janssens (died 1581), was a Dutch businessperson.

She was married to Hendrik van Duysborch (d. 1550) and took over the business of her spouse when she was widowed. She managed two breweries, land as well as a trading empire with base in Antwerp. She traded with England as well as Germany and the Spanish crown at the Canarie islands. She was a substantial member of the merchant class and one of the richest people in Antwerp at the time of her death.

A street is named after her.
